The first season of Chuck originally aired between September 24, 2007 and January 24, 2008. The season, cut short by the Writers' Strike, contains thirteen episodes. It introduced the series' main characters and established the general plot of the title character, Chuck Bartowski, having to adapt to his new life as a spy after the only remaining copy of the U.S. government's spy secrets are embedded into his brain. He is forced to juggle his responsibilities as a spy and the supervisor of a technical support team, called the "Nerd Herd", at his local Buy More store (a parody of Best Buy). Having become the most important asset of the U.S. government, Chuck is under the constant surveillance of his CIA handler, Sarah Walker, and NSA agent John Casey, who remind him that he cannot reveal his spy life to his sister Ellie, nor his best friend Morgan Grimes.

Cast and characters

Main cast 
 Zachary Levi as Charles "Chuck" Bartowski (13 episodes)
 Yvonne Strahovski as Agent Sarah Walker (13 episodes)
 Joshua Gomez as Morgan Grimes (13 episodes)
 Sarah Lancaster as Dr. Eleanor "Ellie" Bartowski (12 episodes)
 Adam Baldwin as Major John Casey (13 episodes)

Supporting cast

Episodes

Reception 
The first season averaged on, only including the first 11 episodes, 8.68 million viewers per episode.

UK BARB ratings

Home media release

References

External links 
 
 

 
2007 American television seasons
2008 American television seasons